The EMG 81 is a popular active humbucker guitar pickup manufactured by EMG, Inc. It is usually considered a lead pickup for use in the bridge position, paired with EMG's 85 as a rhythm pickup in neck position (Zakk Wylde is famous for this configuration). It's not uncommon, however, to see a guitar with two EMG 81s in both bridge and neck positions (for instance, Kirk Hammett's  EMG-KH21 pickup sets, which include two EMG 81 pickups for both neck and bridge positions).

The EMG 81 pickup is preferred as a lead pickup because of its high output and smooth control from having a rail magnet.  Rail magnets tend to sound smoother through string bends because they have a constant "rail" that runs through the pickup, while typical guitar pickups have polepieces under each string that lose signal strength as the string bends away from the polepiece. The EMG 81 can be recognized by its dark grey humbucker form-factor and a silver embossed EMG logo.

With its high output, focused mids, consistent tone, tight attack and distinct clarity even under heavy distortion, the EMG 81 is a classic favorite among heavy metal guitar players.

History and design 
The EMG-81 was developed in 1979 and released to the market in 1981 (hence the model number). Construction is similar to traditional U-shaped pickups, but there are no separate pole pieces; steel bars (rails) are used instead. The Alnico V magnets of earlier discontinued models have been replaced with ceramic ones. While nominal output is the same as current EMG 85, lower noise ratio gives more gain opportunity.

As most other modern EMG pickups, today's EMG-81 has a Quik-connect output, which is a five-pin header on the pickup which comes with a compatible wiring harness. This allows for a less complicated pickup swap in the future, only requiring the removal the pickup guard and disconnecting the pickup, as opposed to melting the solder and installing the new pickup.

A few variants of the EMG 81 have also been released, such as the TW and X. The 81TW version features two separate pickups and preamps in a single pickup housing, allowing for single-coil and humbucking tones.  The 81-X provides increased headroom giving the voicing an organic and open tone while still maintaining clarity and response.

18V Mod 
The EMG 81 power source can be modified from 9V to 18V by adding a second 9V battery wired in series. This increases the headroom of the pickup and decreases distortion, particularly with regard to transients. Although the majority of EMG's pickups are rated for 27V operation, they recommend a maximum of 18V, citing the negligible performance increase.

There are two main ways to perform this modification. One method involves using separate battery harnesses for each battery. There are several different ways to achieve this, and wiring diagrams can be found all over the internet. The other involves using a separate 9V snap leading to the control cavity to wire two batteries in series outside of the battery compartment.

Guitars that are sold with the EMG 81 as stock 
 Cort EVL-X7 (85 in neck)
 Cort X-TH (85 in neck)
 Cort X500 (60 in neck)
 Cort X6-SA (85 in neck)
 Dean Guitars Razorback 255
 Dean Guitars Razorback V 255
 Dean MAB 1 Armorflame
 Dean ML Knight
 Dean Custom 550 Floyd (EMG 85 in neck)
 Diamond Guitars Barchetta STE FR MTB
 B.C. Rich Mockingbird Pro X (EMG 60 in neck)
 B.C. Rich Mockingbird Pro X Jake Pitts signature model (EMG 81 in neck, too)
 B.C. Rich Kerry King Signature Wartribe (EMG 85 in neck)
 B.C. Rich NJ Deluxe Warbeast (EMG 85 in neck)
 B.C. Rich NJ Deluxe Warlock (EMG 85 in neck)
 B.C. Rich Villain Deluxe (EMG 60 in neck)
 Epiphone 1984 Explorer EX (EMG 85 in neck)
 Epiphone Futura Prophecy Custom EX & FX (EMG 85 in neck)
 Epiphone G-400 Limited Edition
 Epiphone Les Paul Custom Midnight
 Epiphone Les Paul Custom Bjorn Gelotte (EMG 85 in neck)
 Epiphone Les Paul Custom Zakk Wylde (EMG 85 in neck)
 Epiphone Les Paul Prophecy EX
 Epiphone SG Prophecy EX
 ESP Eclipse II
 ESP Eclipse II Standard Series
 ESP Eclipse Limited
 ESP EX
 ESP FX (EMG-60 in neck)
 ESP Jeff Hanneman Signature (EMG 85 in neck)
 ESP JH-1 (EMG-60 in neck)
 ESP JH-2 (EMG-60 in neck)
 ESP JH-3
 ESP KH-1
 ESP KH-2
 ESP KH-2 Relic
 ESP KH-3
 ESP KH-4
 ESP M-II's
 ESP Truckster (EMG-60 in neck)
 ESP LTD AX-400FM
 ESP LTD Deluxe M-1000
 ESP LTD Deluxe EC-1000
 ESP LTD Deluxe MH-1000
 ESP LTD Deluxe H-1001
 ESP LTD EC-2005/EC-500
 ESP LTD EC-400 (EMG-60 in neck)
 ESP LTD EC-500 (EMG-60 in neck)
 ESP LTD EX-400 (EMG-60 in neck)
 ESP LTD EX-400BD (EMG-60 in neck)
 ESP LTD F-2005/F-500
 ESP LTD F-400MF
 ESP LTD F-350
 ESP LTD FX-400 (EMG-60 in neck)
 ESP LTD "The Grynch" (EMG-60 in neck)
 ESP LTD KH-602 (since 2009 with EMG-60 in the neck)
 ESP LTD KH-603
 ESP LTD M-400
 ESP LTD MH-350FR  (EMG-85 in neck)
 ESP LTD MH-400 and MH-401 (EMG-85 in neck)
 ESP LTD MH-300 FM (EMG-81 set)
 ESP LTD H-1001
 ESP LTD M-1000
 ESP LTD M-300FM
 ESP LTD MP-600
 ESP LTD Viper 2005 Limited (EMG-85 in neck)
 ESP LTD Viper Deluxe 1000
 ESP LTD V 401DX
 ESP LTD V401B
 ESP LTD V 300
 ESP LTD Viper-400
 ESP LTD VP-2005/VP-500
 ESP M-II Custom (EMG-60 in neck)
 ESP MX Custom Shop
 ESP RZK-1
 ESP SV
 ESP Viper Standard Series
 Fender Jim Root Telecaster (EMG-60 in neck)
 Fender Jim Root Stratocaster (EMG-60 in neck)
 Fernandes Revolver Pro-81
 Gibson Les Paul Studio II EMG
 Gibson Les Paul Zakk Wylde
 Gibson SG Showcase Editions
 Gibson SG Special II EMG
 Godin Freeway EMG
 Godin LG EMG
 Godin Redline 1
 Godin Redline 2 (EMG-85 in neck)
 Godin Redline 3 (EMG-85 in neck)
 Ibanez ART500E (EMG60 in neck)
 Ibanez MBM1 (EMG85 in neck)
 Ibanez RGA72TQMZE (EMG 81/85)
 Ibanez RGT6EX (EMG85 in neck)
 Ibanez RG3520ze (EMG 81/85)
 Ibanez RG8420ZE (EMG 81/85)
 Ibanez RGIR20E Iron Label (EMG 81/60) 
 Ibanez RGIR20FE Iron Label (EMG 81/60) 
 Ibanez RGIX20FEQM Iron Label (EMG 81/60) 
 Ibanez RGIB6 Iron Label (EMG 81/60) 
 Jackson Stealth
 Jackson DKMG Dinky (EMG-85 in Neck)
 Jackson DKMGT Dinky (EMG-85 in Neck)
 Jackson RR24 Rhoads 
 Jackson RRTMG Rhoads (EMG-85 in Neck)
 Jackson RRXMG Rhoads (EMG-85 in Neck)
 Jackson RRMG Rhoads (EMG-85 in Neck)
 Jackson JCS Kelly KE2 (EMG-85 in Neck)
 Jackson KVMG King V (EMG-85 in Neck)
 Jackson KVMGQ King V (EMG-85 in Neck)
 Jackson KVXMG King V (EMG-85 in Neck)
 Jackson Demmelition King V (EMG-60 in Neck)
 Jackson SLSMG Soloist (EMG-85 in Neck) (After July 2006)
 Jackson SLATXMG3-6 Soloist (EMG-85 in Neck)
 Jackson SLATXMGQ3-6 Soloist (EMG-85 in Neck)
 Jackson SLATTXMG3-6 Soloist (EMG-85 in Neck)
 Jackson SLATTXMGQ3-6 Soloist (EMG-85 in Neck)
 Jackson WRXMG Warrior (EMG-85 in Neck)
 Jackson WRXTMG Warrior (EMG-85 in Neck)
 Jackson WRMG Warrior (EMG-85 in Neck)
 Jackson DK1 Dinky (EMG-85 in Neck)
 Schecter Guitar Research Hellraiser guitars
 Schecter Guitar Research Damien Elite (EMG 81/85)
 Schecter Guitar Research Damien Eilte Avenger (EMG 81/85)
 Schecter Guitar Research Devil Spine
 Schecter Guitar Research Devil Custom
 Schecter Guitar Research Stiletto Classic
 Schecter Guitar Research Jeff Loomis jlv-6 FR
 Steinberger Guitars Synapse Demon TranScale (EMG 81/85)
 Washburn X50Pro FE
 UVA Instruments - Baphomet
 Paul Reed Smith SE Torero (81 bridge, 85 neck)

References

External links 
 EMG data sheet (an Adobe PDF file)

Guitar pickups